Pamela Sargent (born March 20, 1948) is an American feminist, science fiction author, and editor. She has an MA in classical philosophy and has won a Nebula Award.

Sargent wrote a trilogy concerning the terraforming of Venus that is sometimes compared to Kim Stanley Robinson's Mars trilogy, but predates it. She also edited various anthologies to celebrate the contributions of women in the history of science fiction including the Women of Wonder series. She also edited the Nebula Award Showcase from 1995 to 1997. She is noted for writing alternate history stories. She also collaborated with George Zebrowski on four Star Trek novels.

Personal life
Pamela Sargent was born in Ithaca, New York, and raised as an atheist. She attended the State University of New York at Binghamton, attaining a master's degree in philosophy. She currently lives in Albany, New York.

Bibliography

Seed Trilogy
Earthseed (1983)
Farseed (2007)
Seed Seeker (2010)

Venus
Venus of Dreams (1986)
Venus of Shadows (1988)
Child of Venus (2001)

Watchstar
Watchstar (1980)
Eye of the Comet (1984)
Homesmind (1984)

Novels
Cloned Lives (1976)
Sudden Star (1979)  a.k.a. The White Death (1980)
The Golden Space (1982)
The Alien Upstairs (1983)
The Shore of Women (1986)
Alien Child (1988)
Ruler of the Sky (1993)
Climb the Wind (1998)

Star Trek novels
All co-written with George Zebrowski

Based on Star Trek: The Original Series television series
 Heart of the Sun (1997)
 Across the Universe (1999)
 Garth of Izar (2003)

Based on Star Trek: The Next Generation television series
 A Fury Scorned (1996)

Collections
Cloned Lives (1976)
Starshadows (1977)
The Golden Space (1983)
The Best of Pamela Sargent (1987) with Martin H. Greenberg
The Mountain Cage and Other Stories (2002)
Eye of Flame (2003)
Thumbprints (2004)

Anthologies edited

Women of Wonder series
Women of Wonder (1975)
More Women of Wonder (1976)
The New Women of Wonder (1978)
Women of Wonder: The Classic Years (1996)
Women of Wonder: The Contemporary Years (1996)

Nebula Award anthologies
Nebula Awards 29 (1995)
Nebula Awards 30 (1996)
Nebula Awards 31 (1997)

Other
Bio-Futures: Science Fiction Stories About Biological Metamorphosis (1976)
Three in Space (1981) with Jack Dann and George Zebrowski
Afterlives (1986) with Ian Watson
Three in Time (1997) with Jack Dann and George Zebrowski
Conqueror Fantastic (2004)

Nonfiction
Firebrands: The Heroines of Science Fiction and Fantasy (1976) with Ron Miller

Awards
In 1993, Pamela Sargent won the Nebula Award for Best Novelette published in 1992, for "Danny Goes to Mars". This novelette originally appeared in Asimov's magazine in October 1992.

In 2012, Sargent won the Pilgrim Award for lifetime contributions to SF/F studies.

References

Sources
 The Encyclopedia of Science Fiction
 SFWA
 ISFDB

External links
 
 
Golden Gryphon Press official site – About Thumbprints
Pamela Sargent's Official Wattpad Profile

 
1948 births
American feminists
American science fiction writers
Women science fiction and fantasy writers
Writers of young adult science fiction
American alternate history writers
Nebula Award winners
Living people
20th-century American novelists
21st-century American novelists
20th-century American women writers
21st-century American women writers
American women novelists
Women historical novelists
Women speculative fiction editors